Eschede is a municipality in the district of Celle, in Lower Saxony, Germany. Situated approximately 15 km northeast of Celle, Eschede lies at the border of the Südheide Nature Park, a protected area of large forests and heaths. Today around 20 small villages are part of the "Gemeinde Eschede".

In 1975, the largest forest fire in the history of Germany destroyed vast tracts of forests in the area. The place is also known for the 1998 Eschede train disaster, in which an ICE 1 train crashed, killing 101 and making it the worst German rail accident since the Second World War.

The painter Albert König (1881–1944) was born in Eschede, and the "Albert-König-Museum" can be visited in Unterlüß nearby.

Eschede was the seat of the former Samtgemeinde ("collective municipality") of Eschede.

Notable people
Wilhelm Brese (1896–1994), German politician (DNVP, CNBL, CDU), was chairman of the savings and loan association in Eschede and was leader of the church council in Eschede
Erich Schell House (1901–1983), German civil servant and politician (NSDAP, later GB / BHE, GDP, CDU), lived after the war in the rectory in Eschede
Goede Gendrich (1912–2000), German forester and author
Hans-Hubertus Bühmann (1921–2014), German forestry and Lower Saxony state politician (CDU), was a board member of the forestry association and Eschede Samtgemeinde mayor of the municipality Eschede
Ernst Bauerochse (born 1925), German missionary and church representatives, went to school in Eschede

Sister town
 Barneville-Carteret, Manche, Normandy, France

References

External links 
 Eschede Official Website 
 

Celle (district)